Matrix model may refer to:

 a model using a matrix in mathematics
 Matrix theory (physics), a quantum mechanical model 
 Matrix population models, a type of population model that uses matrix algebra
 Matrix management, an organizational structure

See also
 Matrix (disambiguation)
 Algebraic logic
 Complete graph
 Lax pair
 String theory

Mathematics disambiguation pages